The Estadi Comunal d'Andorra la Vella is a small football stadium in Andorra la Vella, the capital of Andorra. The stadium has a capacity of 1300.

The stadium also has a running track. The Estadi Comunal d'Andorra la Vella and the Camp d’Esports d’Aixovall together host all games from Andorra's two highest football competitions, the Primera Divisió and the Segona Divisió.

It also hosted all Andorra national football team games until the opening of the Estadi Nacional in 2014.

References

Football venues in Andorra
Athletics (track and field) venues in Andorra
Sport in Andorra la Vella